Tvillingen is the eighth studio album by Swedish singer/songwriter Darin, released on 24 November 2017 by his own record label Dex Music and distributed by Sony Music. It is the second of Darin's albums to entirely contain Swedish songs, with the first being Fjärilar i magen, which was released on 25 September 2015. Before the release of the album, the single "Ja må du leva" had been certified double platinum in Sweden and the single "Tvillingen" had been certified gold. Subsequently, the album reached number one on the Swedish album chart in the first week following its release and was certified platinum in the end of 2017.

Background 
The title of the album (in English "Gemini") was chosen with regard to the way that the album reflects Darin's different personalities and since it is his star sign. After the success of his previous release, Darin was interested in releasing another album with more personal songs and lyrics. He continued with releasing music in Swedish since for him it makes it easier to bring up themes that are important to him and also makes it easier for his audience to understand his work.

Critical reception 

The album was generally well received by Swedish music critics, with many reviewers praising the tone of the album and the production, while some were critical towards Darin's new musical direction.

Track listing 
Credits adapted from Spotify.

Personnel 
Credits adapted from Spotify.

 Darin Zanyar – vocals , production  songwriting .
 David Lindgren Zacharias – production , songwriting .
 Ollie Olson – production , songwriting .
 Lars Halapi – songwriting and production .
 Peter Kvint – songwriting .
 Smith & Thell – vocals , production .

Charts

Weekly charts

Year-end charts

Certifications

Release history

References 

2017 albums
Darin (singer) albums
Swedish-language albums